Moussier is both a surname and a given name. Notable people with the name include:

Jeanine Moussier (born 1930), French sprinter
Sabine Moussier (born 1968), German-Mexican actress
Moussier Tombola, Senegalese-French comedian